The Great Mosque of Sana'a is an ancient mosque in Sana'a, Yemen, and one of the oldest mosques in the world. The mosque is said to have been founded in the early Islamic period, suggested to be in 633. While the precise date of construction is unknown, the earliest recorded renovations occurred under Caliph al-Alid I in the early 8th century, implying a possible earlier date of construction. The mosque was reportedly built in part from spolia from the Himyarite-era Ghumdan Palace and from the Axumite Christian Church of al-Qalis that formerly occupied the site. The Great Mosque is the largest and most notable of over one hundred mosques in the Old City of Sana’a.

The building has undergone renovations in the 8th century, the 13th century, and in the Ottoman period. An important archaeological find was the Sana'a manuscript, discovered there during restoration in 1972. Today, the Great Mosque of Sana’a is part of the UNESCO World Heritage Site of the Old City of Sana'a.

Location 

The city of Sana'a was the military center of the pre-Islamic kingdom of the Sabeans and was an important center for the Himyarite Kingdom. The mosque, commissioned by Muhammed, who instructed for its construction within the garden of the Persian governors, was built upon the ruins of Sheba's Ghumdan Palace, between the two areas of Sana'a at the time: al-Qati and al-Sirar. The Great mosque was built near the suq, which was already in place at the time of its construction.

In later years, city planning, expansion and orientation were greatly influenced by the construction of the Great Mosque and two other mosques on the city's north side.

Architecture
The Great Mosque is built in a style of stepped stone, which is linked to similar ancient Abyssinian Axumite stonework. The wooden ceilings, made of lacunari's wood, are carved and painted.

The central courtyard measures 80 by 60 metres (260 ft × 200 ft), with prayer halls arranged in a north–south direction. Halls with three aisles aligned along the east–west direction are built with materials of the pre-Islamic period brought from other areas. Within the courtyard is a domed structure dating back to the 16th century. It is an Ottoman building that resembles the Ka'ba in Mecca, however, it is argued that the two are not connected due to the alternating layers of colored materials, which is an ablaq technique, predating Islam within the region. This structure first served as the mosque's treasury, and later as a storage place for waqf and has a large library and other ancient manuscripts. This structure may originally have had a water feature such as an ablution pool beneath it for those wishing to purify themselves when visiting the mosque.

The interior stone arcades of the flat roofs of the mosque are suggested to be Byzantine architectural features of the Axumite Empire. This is evidenced by the fact that the Axumite Empire erected its largest cathedral within the city of Sana'a and that remains of this cathedral, as well as from Gumdan palace and Christian and Jewish places of worship, are incorporated into the Great Mosque. Further evidence of this relation is an inscription in the pre-Islamic language of the region, Sabaic, in a reused stone arch support implies it is connected to Byzantine architecture.

The western minaret, built during Queen Arwa bint Ahmad's restoration, is similar to those of the mosques of the same period built in Cairo, due to her close links with the Fatimid dynasty in Egypt.

History
Around 630 CE (6 AH), according to early Islamic sources, Muhammad was said to have commanded  the construction of the Great Mosque of Sana’a, and the mosque is known as the first mosque to have been built outside of the Islamic holy cities of Mecca and Medina. During this post-Hijra period (622-632 CE), Sana'a was central in the propagation of the Islamic religion. Many of the archaeological finds discovered in the Great Mosque substantiate an argument for its construction to the era when Muhammad was alive, including a number of spolia from the Axumite Cathedral as well as from the Himyarite Ghumdan Palace. During the 7th century, the remains of pre-Islamic Sana'a were largely destroyed when it became the center for the spread of the Islamic faith during the early years of the Hijrah. This is evidenced by the architectural remains of pre-Islamic buildings found within the Great Mosque.

From 705 to 715 (86–96 AH), the Umayyad caliph al-Walid I expanded the mosque. An inscription found in the courtyard of the mosque dates to 753 CE,  in the Abbasid period.

In 876/7 CE, floods twice caused substantial damage to the mosque, after which it was totally renovated.

In the early 9th century, a minaret was constructed on the east side. In the year 911 CE, Karmatis invaded the city, damaging the mosque.

In the twelfth century, 1130 CE, the Isma`ili Queen Arwa al-Sulayhi restored much of the mosque. She was responsible for the sculpted ceilings of the mosque's eastern, western, and northern wings. The mosque's western minaret was built as a part of this restoration.

In the early 16th century, the mosque was renovated with a domed square structure and the paving of its courtyard.

Discoveries
In 1972–73, when plaster was removed by archaeologists, they discovered some 65 artifacts, including large quantities of old manuscripts and parchments, as well as the Sana'a manuscript, found by construction workers while renovating an attic wall. Four thousand rare Arabic manuscripts were also uncovered that are linked to the start of Islam, the Umayyad period, and Sheba's Palace of Ghamdan and its destruction. One of the Koran found here is said to have been written or compiled by Imam Ali, which is preserved by the mosque library. Early book bindings found at the mosque have been well documented by scholars such as Ursula Dreibholz (1997).

Other archaeological finds at the Great Mosque are remnants of vaults and old buildings connected to the capital when it contained the Axumite Church of al-Qalis , unearthed in 2006.

Preservation

The Great Mosque is included on the UNESCO World Heritage Site List, designated in 1986 as list no. 345, under Criteria: (iv)(v)(vi), which includes 103 mosques, 14 hammams and over 6,000 houses of Sana'a, all built prior to the eleventh century. Preservation of the Great Mosque, which is of exceptional religious and historical value, has been supported by UNESCO's World Heritage Institute of Training and Research-Asia and Pacific (Shanghai). Analysis of the damage suffered by the mosque over several centuries includes evidence of floods, rains, soil subsidence, old electrical wiring and connections, groundwater seepage, vandalism and wars, and also weak old buildings adjoining the mosque.

Repairs and maintenance, initiated in 2003, continue to be carried out in phases, such as electrical system renovation. Plastering has been redone, including restoration of the old traditional plaster known as qudad. Pavings have been improved and minarets are being restored. Improvements have been made in ablution areas and modern toilets were added. Other improvements have been made to the water supply and sewerage systems, as well as removal of old buildings which do not match with the historical and architectural features of the mosque.

References

Further reading 

 Finster, Barbara, "Die Freitagsmoschee von Ṣan‘ā’," Baghdader Mitteilungen 9 (1978), p. 92-133; 10 (1979), p. 179-192.
 Finster, Barbara. "Die Grosse Moschee von Ṣan‘ā," Archäologische Berichte aus dem Yemen 1, 1982, p. 197-211, 3, 1986, p. 185-193.
 Finster, Barbara. "Survey islamischer Bau- und Kunstdenkmäler im Yemen - Die Große Moschee von Ṣan‘ā'", Archäologische Berichte aus dem Yemen, III, 1986 (1987), 185–193.
 Costa, Paolo. “La Moschea Grande di San’a,” Annali. Instituto Orientale di Napoli 34 (N.S. 24) (1974), pp/ 487–506.
 Costa, Paolo. Studies in Arabian Architecture, London: Routledge, 1994, chapter II “The Great Mosque of Sanaa.” 

Mosques in Sanaa